Maurice Sinet (31 December 1928 – 5 May 2016), known professionally as Siné, was a French political cartoonist. His work is noted for its anti-capitalism, anti-clericalism, anti-colonialism, anti-semitism, and anarchism.

Biography

As a young man Siné studied drawing and graphic arts, while earning a living as a cabaret singer. His first published drawing appeared in France Dimanche in 1952. His series of drawings on cats was his breakthrough. He then started working for L'Express as a political cartoonist.

Siné's anti-colonialism caused controversy during the Algerian war. He was sued a number of times, being defended by Jacques Vergès, then a lawyer for the Algerian Liberation Front.

In 1962 Siné left L'Express and published a book of his work called Siné Massacre, noted for its anti-colonialism, anti-capitalism, anti-clericalism and anarchism.

In reviewing the book, the British satirical magazine Private Eye described Siné's cartoons as "grotesque", and criticised publisher Penguin Books for its managerial incompetence.

In 1965 Siné became involved in a power struggle at Penguin Books. During an attempt by chief editor Tony Godwin and the board of directors to remove the company founder Allen Lane, Lane stole and burned the entire print run of the English edition of Siné's book Massacre, which was reportedly deeply offensive.

In May 1968, together with Jean-Jacques Pauvert, Siné launched L'Enragé, a short-lived satirical journal associated with the May 1968 events in France.

Death
Siné died after undergoing surgery at a hospital in Paris on 5 May 2016, aged 87. He had been battling cancer for several years.

Controversy and sacking
In 1982, shortly after a terrorist attack had taken place on Jews in Paris, Siné gave an interview on the radio during which he stated: "Yes, I am anti-Semitic and I am not scared to admit it [...] I want all Jews to live in fear, unless they are pro-Palestinian. Let them die." He later apologised for his comments.

In July 2008, Siné's column in the magazine Charlie Hebdo contained this comment on Jean Sarkozy's rumoured impending conversion to Judaism so he could marry a Jewish heiress of the wealthy Darty family, Jessica Sebaoun-Darty: "He'll go a long way in life, this lad!" Sarkozy and Sebaoun-Darty married but Sarkozy has affirmed that he did not convert to Judaism. The incident led to complaints of anti-Semitism and journalist Claude Askolovitch described the comments as anti-Semitic.

The magazine's editor, Philippe Val, ordered Siné to write a letter of apology or face termination. The cartoonist said he would rather "cut his own balls off", and was promptly fired. Both sides subsequently filed lawsuits, and in December 2010, Siné won a 40,000-euro court judgment against his former publisher for wrongful termination.

Siné reported a death threat posted on a site run by the Jewish Defense League. The text said "20 centimeters of stainless steel in the gut, that should teach the bastard to stop and think."

References

External links

 Siné biography on Lambiek Comiclopedia

1928 births
2016 deaths
French cartoonists
French editorial cartoonists
Artists from Paris
20th-century French journalists
21st-century French journalists
Deaths from cancer in France
Burials at Montmartre Cemetery
French anarchists